DictionaryVisual (meaning Dictionary Visual) is a Spanish community of users seeking a new way to learn other languages. The set of words are organized into groups, categories and subcategories. Each of the words an associated pronunciation and an accurate picture. Its dictionaries can be consulted free online from any web browser.

Dictionaries 
The website hosts four free language based bilingual dictionaries. The dictionaries are characterized by providing images with the meaning facilitating translations, understanding and memorizing. Another relevant point is the clearness of the presentation, without a huge amount of entries and chaos.

References

External links 
Visual dictionary online (website) 

Online dictionaries